Camp Farwell is a  summer camp for girls in Newbury, Vermont on Halls Lake. Founded in 1889 by Julia Farwell, it may be the longest running all-girls camp in the United States.

References

External links
Camp Farwell Homepage 

Farwell
1906 establishments in the United States
Buildings and structures in Newbury, Vermont